Greci is a commune in Tulcea County, Northern Dobruja, Romania. It is composed of a single village, Greci.

References

Communes in Tulcea County
Localities in Northern Dobruja